Tiago Fernandes was the defending champion, having defeated Sean Berman in the 2010 final. He chose not to defend his title.Jiří Veselý won the title defeating Luke Saville 6–0, 6–3, in the final. The player from Czech Republic won every match in straight sets.

Seeds

Note: Bruno Sant'anna forgot to apply for a place in the tournament. He was given a wild card for the qualification round through which he qualified for the tournament.

Draw

Final rounds

Top half

Section 1

Section 2

Bottom half

Section 3

Section 4

References
 Main Draw
 Qualifying Draw

Boys' Singles
Australian Open, 2011 Boys' Singles